Grigol Robakidze University (Georgian: გრიგოლ რობაქიძის სახელობის უნივერსიტეტი [grigol robakidzis saxelobis universiteti]) is established in 1992 in Tbilisi, Georgia.  It specialises in medicine and dentistry, but also has courses in the social sciences, English and German.

The university was renamed in honor of the Georgian poet and thinker, Grigol Robakidze.

Location
The university's faculties are on Irina Enukidze #3 (David Aghmashebeli #13), in the downtown of Tbilisi, Georgia and includes a new building located near US Embassy in the suburb of Tbilisi.

Schools
:
 School of Humanities and Social Sciences
 School of Law
 School of Business and Management
 School of Medicine
 School of Public Administration and Politics

Institutions and research centers:
 Institute of Philosophy and Social Sciences
 Scientific-Research institute of public administration
 Institute of Comparative Law
 Additional Education Training Center

Library
The library has about 20,000 books and digital material are kept in the library. Service is systematically developed in the library. The electronic library was established in 2010. This enables consumers to choose books and periodicals

References

External links

Universities in Georgia (country)
Education in Tbilisi